Pethick is a surname. Notable people with the surname include:

Christopher J. Pethick (born 1942), English theoretical physicist
Emmeline Pethick-Lawrence (1867–1954), British women's rights activist
Frederick Pethick-Lawrence, 1st Baron Pethick-Lawrence, PC (1871–1961), British Labour politician
Robbie Pethick (born 1970), retired English football defender

See also
Egloskerry, Cornwall - where a legal precedent was set by the local Pethick family